WGAI (560 kHz) is a commercial AM radio station licensed to Elizabeth City, North Carolina, serving Elizabeth City and the Outer Banks.  It broadcasts a Black Gospel/Christian radio format.  WGAI is owned and operated by George Gregory, through licensee Gregory Communications License, Inc.

The station's studio and offices are located in Moyock, North Carolina.  The transmitter is off Lovers Lane in Elizabeth City.

History
WGAI went through many formats with Top 40 in the 1960s and early 1970s, Adult Contemporary in the late 1970s, Country in the mid-1980s, and Adult Contemporary again in the late 1980s. Joy Smith, daughter of famous DJ Bob "Wolfman Jack" Smith, was briefly an afternoon DJ at WGAI in 1989 as "Joy Jack". WGAI would drop music altogether in 1994 when it began its News/Talk/Sports format. In 2015 WGAI was purchased by George Gregory. The format is Gospel and Christian Talk.

References

External links
 WGAI 560 Online
 NewsRadio 560 Online

GAI
News and talk radio stations in the United States
Radio stations established in 1947
1947 establishments in North Carolina